Alexandre Garcia (born 25 June 1988 in Marseille, Bouches-du-Rhône) is a French former professional footballer who played for as a forward.

References

External links 
 
 

1988 births
Living people
Footballers from Marseille
French footballers
Association football forwards
Segunda División B players
Ligue 2 players
Championnat National players
SC Bastia players
ÉFC Fréjus Saint-Raphaël players
FCA Calvi players